Moviliţa may refer to several places in Romania:

 Movilița, Ialomița, a commune in Ialomița County
 Movilița, Vrancea, a commune in Vrancea County
 Moviliţa, a village in Răchitoasa Commune, Bacău County
 Moviliţa, a village in Săgeata Commune, Buzău County
 Moviliţa, a village in Topraisar Commune, Constanța County

See also 
 Movila (disambiguation)
 Movilă (surname)
 Movileni (disambiguation)